Lidman is a surname. Notable people with the surname include:

 David Louis Lidman (1905–1982), American writer about philately
 Dick Lidman (born 1967), Swedish former footballer
 Håkan Lidman (1915–2000), Swedish hurdler
 Sara Lidman (1923–2004), Swedish writer
 Sven Lidman (clergyman), (1786–1845), Swedish clergyman
 Sven Lidman (lexicographer) (born 1921), Swedish lexicographer, son of the writer Sven Lidman
 Sven Lidman (writer) (1882–1960), Swedish military officer, poet, writer, and preacher